The Viscount of Paço de Nespereira is a Portuguese title bestowed by King Luís I of Portugal in 1886 to a member of the Lobo Machado family, Gaspar de Sousa Lobo Machado, 9th Lord of Santão, even though the lordship of Paço de Nespereira was traditionally of held in the hands of the Amaral-Cardoso-de-Menezes clan.

History

The lordship of Paço de Nespereira can be traced to the Middle Ages, to the Amaral-Cardoso-de-Menezes family. In 1538, King John III provided Pedro Cardoso do Amaral (and by extent his family) the hereditary title, to the contador-mor of the Kingdom, an agnate descendant of the royal family of the Kingdom of León. The hereditary seat of the Viscounts of Paço de Nespereira is the medieval Paço de Nespereira, an estate and gardens in the civil parish of Nespereira, municipality of Guimarães. It was only in the second half of the 16th century, the Paço de Nespereira began bearing the family shield over the main doorway (sometime around 1560).

In 1886, the title of viscount of Paço de Nespereira was granted to Gaspar Lobo de Sousa Machado e Couros, married to heir to the Majorat, D. Maria Amélia do Carmo de Menezes, daughter of the first Viscount of Pindela and D. Maria Amélia Barreto do Amaral.

During the 19th century, the clan was the "first family" of Guimarães nobility, both because of its wealth and connections to the nobility of the region. In the beginning of the 19th century, Lord Fortunato do Amaral-Cardoso-de-Menezes (then 15th Lord of Paço de Nespereira) fought on the side of King Miguel, during the Liberal Wars. This option eventually induced him to marry his only daughter and heiress, Maria do Carmo, to the son of another leading noble of the region, the Viscount of Pindela.

At the same time, the Lordship of Santão, in the municipality of Felgueiras, was one of the biggest estates in the region in the 14th century. Belonging, initially, to the Sousa clan by marriage, it became part of the Lobo Machado properties (including the Lobo Machado Palace/Residence), and by extent the family of the 1st Viscount of Paço de Nespereira.

In addition, the Viscounts of Paço de Nespereira's residence in Braga is the Palace of Biscainhos, a monumental manor in the center of the city, in addition to the Palace of Lobo Machado in Guimarães and the estate of Proposto outside of Guimarães. The Lobo Machado Palace, as well as the Santão estate were inherited by the younger son of the first viscount who inherited the title of Lord of Santão.

List of viscounts

 Gaspar Lobo Machado, 1st Viscount of Paço de Nespereira, Lord of Santão, who as the leader of the Guimarães' nobility was created Viscount in 1886 by the King Luís I. He married Lady Maria Amélia Pinheiro de Mello (daughter of the Viscount of Pindella) and heiress to the House of Paço de Nespereira. In order to preserve the position of the Lord of Paço de Nespereira's family, as there was no heir, the King created Viscount the husband of the granddaughter of the last Lord of Paço de Nespereira, Fortunato. He had three sons that included: Rodrigo Lobo Machado, Pedro Lobo Machado (Lord of Santão), and;
 João Lobo Machado do Amaral-Cardoso-de-Menezes, who married Lady Maria da Conceição Pereira da Silva, daughter of the Earl and Countess of Bertiandos;
 Gaspar Lobo Machado do Amaral-Cardoso-de-Menezes, who married Lady Maria Adelaide Menezes (daughter of the Earl of Guarda)

Ancestors
Ancestry of the third Viscount of Paço de Nespereira

References
Notes

Sources
 
  
 

Paço de Nespereira
1886 establishments in Portugal